Assassination Bureau can refer to:

 The Assassination Bureau, a 1969 British film.
 Assassination Bureau, an organization of assassins in DC Comics.